Maravathe Kanmaniye is a 1999 Indian Tamil-language romantic drama film directed by N. S. Madhavan. The film stars Vineeth and Ravali, with Karan, Reshma, Sivakumar and Senthil playing supporting roles. It was released on 7 October 1999.

Cast

Vineeth
Karan
Ravali
Reshma
Sivakumar
Vennira Aadai Moorthy
Senthil
Kazan Khan
Madhan Bob
C. R. Saraswathi
Chinni Jayanth
Karikalan
Kanagaraj
Balaji
Imayavan
Theni Thenali

Production
When the film was launched in late 1997, Suriya was expected to star in the lead role and work alongside his father Sivakumar for the first time. However, he later opted out and was replaced by Vineeth. Ravali dieted and got into shape for her role in the film.

Soundtrack

The film score and the soundtrack were composed by Mahakumar. The soundtrack, released in 1999, features 4 tracks.

References

1999 films
1990s Tamil-language films
Indian romantic drama films
1999 directorial debut films
1999 romantic drama films